Back Stage Bar is a bar and restaurant operated by McMenamins in Portland, Oregon.

Description
Back Stage Bar is located behind Bagdad Theatre in Southeast Portland's Richmond neighborhood. The interior has billiard tables, vaulted ceilings, three-story oriental rugs, and a sign from the Jockey Club, a defunct dive bar along North Killingsworth. Portland Monthly says, "If you're not quite ready to run the table, odds are you'll dig the mellow scene at Back Stage Bar, where clusters of cue-wielding Hawthorne hipsters are all in good, groovy moods."

History

Reception
In 2014, Samantha Bakall included Back Stage Bar in The Oregonian list of "Portland's 10 best bars for games". The newspaper also included Back Stage Bar in a list of the city's 100 best bars.

References

External links

 
 McMenamins Back Stage Bar mural, The Gallery, Multnomah County Library

Drinking establishments in Oregon
McMenamins
Restaurants in Portland, Oregon
Richmond, Portland, Oregon
Year of establishment missing